Marks and Spencer plc v BNP Paribas Securities Services Trust Company (Jersey) Ltd [2015] UKSC 72 is an English contract law case, concerning the implication of terms in commercial contracts, and business tenancies agreed between multinational corporations.

Facts
Marks & Spencer, which was subleasing ‘The Point’ in Paddington Basin, W2 from BNP Paribas, claimed there should be an implied right to recover money that it had paid under its lease when it exercised the right to terminate. The basic rent was £1.23m a year, plus a premium of £919,800 plus VAT, service charge, and a car park licence fee. The rent had to be paid by the quarter. The landlord could recover by rent a ‘fair proportion’ of building insurance costs and building service charges. Clause 8 allowed M&S to end the lease on 24 January 2012 with 6 months advance notice if there were no arrears in rent, and this meant the rent needed to be paid up to the end of the quarter, which was longer than the time M&S occupied the property. M&S did so, and then claimed it should get back the rent from 25 January to 24 March 2012. The default law on apportionability would have suggested the rent could not be recovered, under the Apportionment Act 1870, but it was argued that it was an implication of the contract that it should be.

Judgment
The Supreme Court held that the term in the lease to recover the extra portion of the rent should not be implied. The Court discussed and affirmed Lord Hoffmann's views in AG of Belize, noting that implication was part of the process of "determining the scope and meaning of the contract".

Lord Neuberger (with whom Lord Sumption and Lord Hodge concurred) said the following.

Lord Carnwath concurred, saying that he did not see a substantive difference between Lord Neuberger's approach and Lord Hoffmann's approach in AG of Belize.

Lord Clarke gave a concurring judgment.

See also

English contract law

References

English contract case law